Langley—Abbotsford (formerly known as Langley—Matsqui) was a federal electoral district in British Columbia, Canada, that was represented in the House of Commons of Canada from 1997 to 2004.

Geography 

It consisted of the western part of Central Fraser Valley Regional District and the northwestern part of Langley District Municipality.

History 
"Langley—Matsqui" riding was created in 1996 from parts of Fraser Valley East, Fraser Valley West and Surrey—White Rock—South Langley. The riding was renamed "Langley—Abbotsford" in 1997. It was only used in the 1997 and 2000 federal elections. The riding was abolished in 2003, divided between the ridings of Abbotsford and Langley.

Member of Parliament 

This riding elected only one Member of Parliament:

Election results

See also 

 List of Canadian federal electoral districts
 Past Canadian electoral districts

External links 
Riding history from the Library of Parliament:
Langley—Matsqui
Langley—Abbotsford
 Expenditures - 2000
 Expenditures – 1997
 Website of the Parliament of Canada

Former federal electoral districts of British Columbia